USS Joanna (SP-1963), was a United States Navy patrol vessel in commission from 1917 to 1920.

Joanna was built as a private motorboat of the same name in 1917 by the Albany Boat Corporation at Watervliet, New York. In 1917, the U.S. Navy purchased her from her owner, Martin A. Metzner, for use as a section patrol boat during World War I. The Navy took delivery of her on 9 December 1917, and she was commissioned as USS Joanna (SP-1963) that month.

Assigned to the 3rd Naval District, Joanna served on patrol duty for the rest of World War I. In 1920 the Navy wrote her off as "unaccounted for abroad" and she was stricken from the Navy List.

Notes

References
 
 Department of the Navy Naval History and Heritage Command Online Library of Selected Images: Civilian Ships: Joanna (Motor Boat, 1917); Later USS Joanna (SP-1963), 1917-1920
 NavSource Online: Section Patrol Craft Photo Archive Joanna (SP 1963)

Patrol vessels of the United States Navy
World War I patrol vessels of the United States
Ships built in New York (state)
1917 ships